is a 2015 Japanese horror mystery film directed by Yoshihiro Nakamura and starring Yūko Takeuchi. The film was released in Japan by Shochiku on January 30, 2016.

Plot
Ai is a mystery novel writer. She received a letter from Kubo, a reader of her novel and a university student. Kubo's letter states that she hears odd sounds from the room where she lives now. Ai becomes interested by the letter and they being to investigate. Ai and Kubo learn of people that lived in the apartment and their experiences including a suicide and murder.

Cast
Yūko Takeuchi as I
Ai Hashimoto as Ms. Kubo
Kentaro Sakaguchi as Koichi Amikawa / Peace
Kenichi Takitō
Kuranosuke Sasaki

Production

Release
It was released in Japan on January 30, 2016.

Reception
As of February 21, the film had grossed  in Japan.

Deborah Young of The Hollywood Reporter called the film "a nicely constructed tale, but too tame to scare anybody."

References

External links
 

2015 horror films
2010s Japanese-language films
2010s mystery horror films
Japanese mystery horror films
Films directed by Yoshihiro Nakamura
Shochiku films
Films based on horror novels
Films based on Japanese novels
2010s Japanese films

ja:残穢#映画